Aliabad-e Pain (also Romanized as ‘Alīābād-e Pā’īn; also known as ‘Alīābād) is a village in Hombarat Rural District, in the Central District of Ardestan County, Isfahan Province, Iran. At the 2006 census, its population was 15, in 4 families.

References 

Populated places in Ardestan County